A re-entry permit is required by some countries, for their citizens or tourists who leave the country for an extended period of time. For example, the United States issues a re-entry permit to a resident alien who plans to travel abroad for an extended period of time (up to two years) while maintaining their permanent residency.

References
 I Am a Permanent Resident How Do I… Get a Reentry Permit. United States Citizenship and Immigration Services. August 2008. Retrieved November 13, 2010.

See also
 Hong Kong Re-entry Permit
 Japan Re-entry Permit
 U.S. Re-entry Permit

International travel documents
Visa policy of the United States